Sinister Errand is a 1945 spy thriller novel by the British writer Peter Cheyney. Cheyney known for his creations Lemmy Caution and Slim Callaghan, introduced a new character the half-American secret agent Michael Kells. It was followed by a sequel Ladies Won't Wait in 1951.

Synopsis
Kells is on the trail of a group of Nazi spies operating in Britain to try and pinpoint the landing spots of V1 rockets to improve their accuracy. On his way he encounters several alluring but treacherous women.

Film adaptation
In 1952 it was loosely adapted into the American film Diplomatic Courier directed by Henry Hathaway and starring Tyrone Power, Patricia Neal and Hildegard Knef. The story was updated and the setting shifted from wartime London to Trieste during the early stages of the Cold War.

References

Bibliography
 Goble, Alan. The Complete Index to Literary Sources in Film. Walter de Gruyter, 1999.
 Panek, LeRoy. The Special Branch: The British Spy Novel, 1890-1980. Popular Press, 1981.
 Reilly, John M. Twentieth Century Crime & Mystery Writers. Springer, 2015.

1945 British novels
Novels by Peter Cheyney
British thriller novels
British spy novels
Novels set in London
Collins Crime Club books
British novels adapted into films
Novels set during World War II